The Queen Giovanna Hospital (or Tsaritsa Yoanna Hospital) is a university hospital in Sofia, the capital of Bulgaria. Named after Giovanna of Savoy, Tsaritsa of Bulgaria and wife of Boris III, the hospital was opened in 1936 and employs a total of 212 academic and non-academic specialists. The hospital has 24 clinics and departments.

External links
 Official website

Hospital buildings completed in 1936
Hospitals in Bulgaria
Hospitals established in 1936
1936 establishments in Bulgaria
Medical University, Sofia